The 1939 Waverley state by-election was held on 22 April 1939 for the New South Wales Legislative Assembly electorate of Waverley because of the death of John Waddell.

Dates

Result

John Waddell died.

See also
Electoral results for the district of Waverley
List of New South Wales state by-elections

Notes

References

1939 elections in Australia
New South Wales state by-elections
1930s in New South Wales